The 1994 United States Senate election in Hawaii was held November 8, 1994. Incumbent Democratic U.S. Senator Daniel Akaka won re-election to his first full term.

Major candidates

Democratic 
 Daniel Akaka, incumbent U.S. Senator

Republican 
 Maria Hustace, cattle rancher and nominee for this U.S. Senate seat in 1988

Results

See also 
 1994 United States Senate elections

References 

Hawaii
1994
United States Senate